August Assmann (1819-1898) was a German entomologist who specialised in 
fossil insects of Lepidoptera and Hemiptera.

His collections are in the Museum of Natural History at University of Wrocław.

Publications
Partial list
1847 Berichtigung und Ergänzung der schlesischen Lepidopteren Fauna Ent. Z. Breslau Lepid. (1) 1: 2-6
1854. Verzeichniss der 1847 bei Constantinopel u. Brussa gefundenen Schmetterlinge. Zeitschrift für Entomologie 8:14-17.
1870. Paleontologie. Beitrage zur Insekten-Fauna der Vorwelt Einleitung. 1 Beitrag. Die fossilen Insekten des tertiaren (miocenen) Thonlagers von Schossnitz bei Kanth in Schles. Z. Entomol. (Breslau). N.F. Ser. 2. Bd 1. S. 42-43
 1870. Paleontologie. Beitrage zur Insekten-Fauna der Vorwelt Einleitung. 2 Beitrag. Fossile Insekten aus der tertiaren (oligocenen) Braunkohle von Naumburg am Bober. Z. Entomol. (Breslau). N.F. 1.1-62.

References
DEI biografi Portrait

1819 births
1898 deaths
German lepidopterists
19th-century German zoologists
Date of birth missing
Date of death missing